Lithuania originally planned to participate in the Eurovision Song Contest 2020 with the song "On Fire" written by Vaidotas Valiukevičius, Robertas Baranauskas and Mantas Banišauskas. The song was performed by the band The Roop. The Lithuanian broadcaster Lithuanian National Radio and Television (LRT) organised the national final  (Let's try again! 2020) in order to select the Lithuanian entry for the 2020 contest in Rotterdam, Netherlands. The national final took place over six weeks and involved 36 competing entries. The results of each show were determined by the combination of votes from a jury panel and a public vote. In the final, eight artists and songs remained and "On Fire" performed by the Roop was selected as the winner.

Lithuania was drawn to compete in the first semi-final of the Eurovision Song Contest which took place on 12 May 2020. However, the contest was cancelled due to the COVID-19 pandemic.

Background

Prior to the 2020 Contest, Lithuania had participated in the Eurovision Song Contest twenty times since its first entry in 1994. The nation's best placing in the contest was sixth, which it achieved in 2006 with the song "We Are the Winners" performed by LT United. Following the introduction of semi-finals for the 2004, Lithuania, to this point, has managed to qualify to the final nine times. In the 2019 contest, "Run with the Lions" performed by Jurij Veklenko failed to qualify to the final.

For the 2020 contest, the Lithuanian national broadcaster, Lithuanian National Radio and Television (LRT), broadcast the event within Lithuania and organised the selection process for the nation's entry. Other than the internal selection of their debut entry in 1994, Lithuania has selected their entry consistently through a national final procedure. LRT confirmed their intentions to participate at the 2020 Eurovision Song Contest on 26 May 2019.

Before Eurovision

Pabandom iš naujo! 2020
 (Let's try again! 2020) was the national final format developed by LRT in order to select Lithuania's entry for the Eurovision Song Contest 2020. The competition involved a six-week-long process that commenced on 11 January 2020 and concluded with a winning song and artist on 15 February 2020. The six shows were hosted by Gabrielė Martirosianaitė, Giedrius Masalskis and Ieva Zasimauskaitė and were broadcast on LRT televizija, LRT Lituanica and LRT Radijas as well as online via the broadcaster's website lrt.lt.

Format 
The 2020 competition involved 36 entries and consisted of six shows. The first three shows were the heats consisting of 12 entries each. The top six entries proceeded in the competition from each heat, while the remaining 18 entries participated in the fifth and sixth shows which were the competition's semi-finals where nine entries participated in each show and the top four proceeded to the final. In the final, the winner was selected from the remaining eight entries. The results of each of the six shows were determined by the 50/50 combination of votes from a jury panel and public televoting. The ranking developed by both streams of voting was converted to points from 1-8, 10 and 12 and assigned based on the number of competing songs in the respective show. During the first five shows, the jury votes were determined by a five-member Lithuanian jury panel only. In the final, an eight-member Lithuanian panel and a three-member international panel voted. The public could vote through telephone and SMS voting. Ties in all shows were decided in favour of the entry that received the most points from the jury.

Competing entries

On 30 September 2019, LRT opened two separate submission forms: one for artists and another for songwriters to submit their songs. Artists that applied to compete with a song were required to indicate which song they wanted to compete with on their application. The submission deadline for both applications concluded on 8 December 2019. On 3 January 2020, LRT announced the 36 artists selected for the competition from more than 60 submissions received.

Shows

Heats 
The three heats of the competition aired from the LRT studios in Vilnius on 11, 18 and 25 January 2020 and featured twelve entries each. The members of the jury consisted of Darius Užkuraitis (LRT Opus director; first and second heat), Gerūta Griniūtė (cultural presenter and event host; first and second heat), Giedrė Kilčiauskienė (singer; first heat), Vaidas Stackevičius (producer; first and third heat), Leon Somov (producer and composer; first and third heat), Aistė Smilgevičiūtė (singer; second heat), Jievaras Jasinskis (composer and musician; second and third heat), Viktoras Diawara (singer and producer; second heat), Ramūnas Zilnys (music reviewer; third heat) and Monika Linkytė (singer-songwriter; third heat). The top six advanced to the semi-finals from each heat, while the bottom six were eliminated. On 2 February 2020, Evgenya Redko withdrew her song "Far", which placed fourth in the third heat, from the semi-finals due to spinal hernia.

Key:
 Semi-finalist
 Absent

Semi-finals 
The two semi-finals of the competition aired from the LRT studios in Vilnius on 1 and 8 February 2020 and featured all remaining entries in the competition. The members of the jury consisted of Ramūnas Zilnys (music reviewer; first and second semi-final), Giedrė Kilčiauskienė (singer; first and second semi-final), Andrius Mamontovas (musician; first semi-final), Monika Linkytė (singer-songwriter; first semi-final), Jievaras Jasinskis (composer and musician; second semi-final), Leon Somov (producer and composer; second semi-final) and Gerūta Griniūtė (cultural presenter and event host; second semi-final). The top four entries advanced to the final from each semi-final, while the bottom entries were eliminated.

Final 
The final of the competition took place on 15 February 2020 at the Žalgirio Arena in Kaunas and featured the remaining eight entries that qualified from the semi-finals. The final was the only show in the competition to be broadcast live; all other preceding shows were pre-recorded earlier in the week before their airdates. Jury voting in the final was decided by an eight-member Lithuanian panel and a three-member international panel. The members of the Lithuanian panel consist of Ramūnas Zilnys (music reviewer), Leon Somov (producer and composer), Vaidas Stackevičius (producer), Viktoras Diawara (singer and producer), Gerūta Griniūtė (cultural presenter and event host), Aistė Smilgevičiūtė (singer), Justė Arlauskaitė-Jazzu (singer) and Simona Albavičiūtė-Bandita (radio host). The international panel consisted of Zita Kaminska (Latvian director and producer), Myles Jessop (British artist agent) and Anthony Marshall (British songwriter, producer and musician). "On Fire" performed by the Roop was selected as the winner after gaining the most points from both the jury vote and the public vote. In addition to the performances of the competing entries, Jurijus opened the show with the 2019 Lithuanian Eurovision entry "Run with the Lions", while the interval acts included juror Jazzu performing the songs "Welcome", "Dumblas" and "Wild", and Samanta Tīna performing the 2020 Latvian Eurovision entry "Still Breathing".

Due to the high influx of SMS votes, around 25,000 televotes were delayed and not considered in the final score. TCG Telecom contacted the organisers the following day and, in co-operation Grand Thornton Baltic, adjusted the scores. These changes did not change the final ranked order but increased The Roop's winning margin.

At Eurovision 
According to Eurovision rules, all nations with the exceptions of the host country and the "Big Five" (France, Germany, Italy, Spain and the United Kingdom) are required to qualify from one of two semi-finals in order to compete for the final; the top ten countries from each semi-final progress to the final. The European Broadcasting Union (EBU) split up the competing countries into six different pots based on voting patterns from previous contests, with countries with favourable voting histories put into the same pot. On 28 January 2020, an allocation draw was held which placed each country into one of the two semi-finals, as well as which half of the show they would perform in. Lithuania was placed into the first semi-final, to be held on 12 May 2020, and was scheduled to perform in the second half of the show. However, due to the COVID-19 pandemic in Europe, the contest was cancelled on 18 March 2020.

Prior to the Eurovision Song Celebration YouTube broadcast in place of the semi-finals, it was revealed that Lithuania had been set to perform in position 6, following the entry from Slovenia and preceding the entry from Ireland.

Alternative song contests 
Some of the broadcasters scheduled to take part in the Eurovision Song Contest 2020 organised alternative competitions. Austria's ORF broadcast  in April 2020, which saw every entry being assigned to one of three semi-finals. A jury consisting of 10 singers that had represented Austria in the Eurovision Song Contest were tasked with ranking each song; the best-placed entry in each semi-final advanced to the final round. In the second semi-final on 16 April 2020, Lithuania placed sixth in a field of 14 participants, achieving 57 points. Lithuania's song also partook in Sveriges Television's  in May, and was qualified to the final round, where it tied for fourth place with Russia.

References

External links

2020
Countries in the Eurovision Song Contest 2020
Eurovision